The 35th European Film Awards, presented by the European Film Academy to recognize achievements in European filmmaking, took place at the Harpa Conference and Concert Hall in Reykjavík, Iceland on 10 December 2022. According to the academy, films eligible for the awards are those that had their first official screening between 1 June 2021 and 31 May 2022 and have a European director.

German actress, director and screenwriter Margarethe von Trotta received the Lifetime Achievement Award while Palestinian actor and director Elia Suleiman was honoured with the Achievement in World Cinema Award.

Selection

Feature Film
Selection's part 1 was announced on 18 August 2022.

 Aftersun – Charlotte Wells
 Alcarràs – Carla Simón ( / )
 All Quiet on the Western Front – Edward Berger ( / )
 As Far as I Can Walk – Stefan Arsenijević ( /  /  /  / )
 The Beasts – Rodrigo Sorogoyen ( / )
 Beautiful Beings  – Guðmundur Arnar Guðmundsson ( /  /  /  / )
 Belfast – Kenneth Branagh ( / )
 Benediction – Terence Davies
 Boy from Heaven – Tarik Saleh ( /  / )
  – Emin Alper ( /  /  /  /  / )
 Close – Lukas Dhont ( /  / )
 Corsage – Marie Kreutzer ( /  /  / )
 The Eight Mountains – Felix van Groeningen & Charlotte Vandermeersch ( /  /)
 Eo – Jerzy Skolimowski ( / )
 Girl Picture – Alli Haapasalo
 Godland – Hlynur Pálmason ( /  /  / )
 The Hole – Michelangelo Frammartino ( /  / )
 Holy Spider – Ali Abbasi ( /  /  / )
 Maixabel – Iciar Bollain
 Mediterranean Fever – Maha Haj ( /  /  / )
 More Than Ever – Emily Atef ( /  /  / )
 Nostalgia – Mario Martone ( / )
 One Fine Morning – Mia Hansen-Løve ( / )
 Pacifiction – Albert Serra ( /  /  / )
 Parallel Mothers – Pedro Almodóvar
 The Quiet Girl – Colm Bairéad
 Rabiye Kurnaz vs. George W. Bush – Andreas Dresen ( / )
 Reflection – Valentyn Vasyanovych
 Saint Omer – Alice Diop
 The Souvenir Part II – Joanna Hogg
 Tori and Lokita – Jean-Pierre & Luc Dardenne ( / )
 Triangle of Sadness – Ruben Östlund ( /  /  / )
 Vera – Tizza Covi & Rainer Frimmel
 Will-o'-the-Wisp – João Pedro Rodrigues ( / )
 Women Do Cry – Mina Mileva & Vesela Kazakova ( / )

Documentary
The selection of 13 documentary films was announced on 30 August 2022. Selection was determied by a committee consisiting of Salma Abdallah (sales agent/Austria), Nenad Puhovski (festival director/Croatia), Katriel Schory (Academy Board – institutional/Israel) and Giedrė Žickytė (director/producer/Lithuania).

 Angels of Sinjar – Hanna Polak ( / )
 The Balcony Movie – Paweł Łoziński
 The Eclipse – Nataša Urban
 Girl Gang – Susanne Regina Meures
 A House Made of Splinters – Simon Lereng Wilmont ( /  /  / )
 How to Save a Dead Friend – Marusya Syroechkovskaya ( /  /  / )
 Karaoke Paradise – Einari Paakkanen

 The March on Rome – Mark Cousins
 Mariupolis 2 – Mantas Kvedaravicius ( /  / )
 Mr. Landsbergis – Sergei Loznitsa ( / )
 Nelly & Nadine – Magnus Gertten ( /  / )
 Republic of Silence – Diana El Jeiroudi ( /  /  /  / )
 A Thousand Fires – Saeed Taji Farouky ( /  /  / )
 Three Minutes – A Lengthening – Bianca Stigter ( / )

Short Film
The European Short Film 2022 is presented in co-operation with the following European film festivals. At each of the festivals, a jury appointed by the festival chooses a single candidate.

 Affairs of the Art – Joanna Quinn ( / ) – Valladolid International Film Festival
 Bachelorette Party – Lola Combourieu & Yann Berlier – Sarajevo Film Festival
 The Bayview – Daniel Cook – Clermont-Ferrand International Short Film Festival
 Becoming Male in the Middle Ages – Pedro Neves Marques – International Film Festival Rotterdam
 Cherries – Vytautas Katkus – Cannes Film Festival
 Dad's Sneakers  – Olha Zhurba – Kort Film Festival Leuven
 Dawn – Leonor Noivo – Hamburg Short Film Festival
 Granny's Sexual Life – Urška Djukić & Émilie Pigeard ( / ) – Uppsala Short Film Festival
 Handbook – Pavel Mozhar – International Short Film Festival Nijmegen
 Ice Merchants – João Gonzalez ( /  / ) – Motovun Film Festival
 Le Saboteur – Anssi Kasitonni – Tampere Film Festival
 Love, Dad – Diana Cam Van Nguyen ( / ) – Kraków Film Festival
 Memoir of a Veering Storm – Sofia Georgovassili – DokuFest
 Neighbour Abdi – Douwe Dijkstra – Locarno Film Festival
 Nest – Hlynur Pálmason ( / ) – Odense Film Festival
 North Pole – Marija Apcevska ( / ) – International Festival of Documentary and Short Film of Bilbao
 On Solid Ground – Jela Hasler – Internationale Kurzfilmtage Winterthur
 The Potemkinists – Radu Jude – Curtas Vila do Conde – International Film Festival
 The Red Suitcase – Cyrus Neshvad – Tirana International Film Festival
 The Salamander Child – Théo Degen – Drama International Short Film Festival
 Sekundenarbeiten – Christiana Perschon – International Short Film Festival Oberhausen
 Snow in September – Lkhagvadulam Purev-Ochir ( / ) – Venice International Film Festival
 The Sower of Stars – Lois Patiño – Berlin International Film Festival
 Steakhouse – Špela Cadež ( /  / ) – International Short Film and Animation Festival PÖFF Shorts
 Techno, Mama – Saulius Baradinskas – International Short Film Festival of Cyprus
 38 – Joanna Rytel – Riga International Film Festival
 Urban Solutions – Arne Hector, Luciana Mazeto, Vinícius Lopes & Minze Tummescheit – Encounters Film Festival
 When I Smile My Eyes Close – Daniel Bolda – Cork International Film Festival
 Will My Parents Come to See Me – Mo Harawe ( /  / ) – Vienna Short Film Festival

Feature Film Awards

Best Film

Best Director

Best Screenwriter

Best Actor

Best Actress

Excellence Awards 
A special eight-members jury consisting of the following representatives of the different arts and crafts chose the winners based on the European Film Awards Feature Film Selection: Henrich Borarós (production designer, Czech Republic), Pascal Capitolin (sound designer, France), Jaime Cebrian (VFX supervisor, Spain), Charlotte Chang (make-up & hair artist, Germany), Christina Georgiou (composer, Cyprus), Magdalena Labuz (costume designer, Luxembourg), Sarah McTeigue (editor, Ireland/Italy), and Nathalie Pitters (cinematographer, UK).

Awards Not Based on Feature Film Selection

European Comedy 
The award is presented to the director of a feature-length European comedy intended for theatrical release. Nominations were announced on 19 October 2022. Nominations were determined by a committee consisting of Graziella Bildesheim (Academy Board – institutional/Italy), Alby James (producer/UK), Denis Ivanov (producer/Ukraine), Roshi Behesht Nedjad (producer/Germany) and Mira Staleva (Academy Board – festival, distributor/Bulgaria).

European Discovery – Prix FIPRESCI 
In co-operation with FIPRESCI, the International Federation of Film Critics, the award is presented to a European director for their first full-length European feature film intended for theatrical release. Nominations were determined by a committee consisting of Kaleem Aftab (film writer, programmer and producer/UK), Janet Bariş (FIPRESCI – film critic/Turkey), Paola Casella (FIPRESCI – film critic/Italy), Virginie Devesa (Academy Board – sales agent/France), Marion Döring (institutional/Germany), Frédéric Ponsard (FIPRESCI – film critic/France), Alik Shpilyuk (FIPRESCI – film critic/Ukraine), Britt Sørensen (FIPRESCI – film critic/Norway) and Joanna Szymańska (Academy Board – producer/Poland).

European Documentary 
The award is presented to the European director(s)  of a European documentary intended for theatrical release.

European Animated Feature Film 
In co-operation with CARTOON, the European Association of Animation Film, the award is presented to the European director(s) of a European animated feature film intended for theatrical release. Nominations were announced on 19 October 2022. Nominations were determined by a committee consisting of Antonio Saura (Academy Board – sales agent/Spain), Jonas Poher Rasmussen (director/Denmark) and Denisa Grimmová (CARTOON – director/Czech Republic).

European Short Film 
The award is presented to the European director(s) of a European short film. The award is presented in cooperation with various European festivals (see Short Film selection above), all of which select a single candidate and later nominate 5 films. The nominees were announced on 19 October 2022.

Honorary Awards

Special Awards

Lux European Audience Film Award
The award is directed to recognize films which help to raise awareness of socio-political issues in Europe.

EFA Young Audience Award (YAA)
The award is presented to the director of a European film that addresses an audience between 12 and 14 years of age. The winner was announcing during the online award ceremony on Sunday, 13 November 2022,  in Erfurt (Germany), hosted by youth council members Maria from Portugal and Emmerson from the UK.

European University Film Award (EUFA) 
Presented in co-operation with Filmfest Hamburg, the award actively involves university students, spreads the “European idea” and transports the spirit of European cinema to an audience group of 20-29-year-olds. It also supports film dissemination, film education and the culture of debating. Based on the Feature Film Selection 2022 and the Documentary Selection 2022 Filmfest Hamburg and EFA nominate five films. They are later viewed in non-commercial closed jury sessions and discussed at the participating universities. The students at each institution select their favourite film. The nominations were announced on 7 October 2022. The winner was announced on 9 December 2022.

References 

E
2022 in Iceland
European Film Awards ceremonies